Brandon Williamson (born April 2, 1998) is an American soccer player who plays as a defensive midfielder for Loudoun United in the USL Championship.

Career

College & Amateur
Williamson played four years of college soccer at Duke University between 2016 and 2019, making 70 appearances, scoring 4 goals and tallying 7 assists.

While playing at college, Williamson also appeared in the USL League Two with Wake FC in 2019.

Professional
Williamson was originally projected to be a first-round draft pick in the 2020 MLS SuperDraft, but went undrafted.

On February 25, 2020, Williamson signed with USL Championship side Loudoun United. He made his professional debut on March 7, 2020, appearing as a 76th-minute substitute in a 0–0 draw with Philadelphia Union II.

References

External links
Duke bio
USL bio

1998 births
Living people
American soccer players
Association football midfielders
Duke Blue Devils men's soccer players
Loudoun United FC players
Soccer players from Virginia
USL League Two players
USL Championship players